Hünenburg Telecommunication Tower is a 164 metre telecommunication tower of Deutsche Telekom AG on Hüneburg near Bielefeld in Germany  It is a concrete tower of FMT 3/72 type.  It is closed to the public.

The tower was built in 1972 as replacement for a smaller telecommunication tower, built in 1952. The old tower was converted into an observation tower, removing the antenna decks and installing intermediate ceilings. It is now called the Hünenburg Observation Tower and houses a museum and restaurant.

An equipment room is located in the telecommunications tower 40 metres above ground with a volume of 2500 cubic metres. The room has a 49.6 metres deck with directional antennas. 

A second smaller antenna deck is situated 55 metres above ground. Further smaller decks for antennas with directional antennas are situated 89 and 123.5 metres above ground.

Between the 123.5 and 146.25 metre levels, there is a  red and white antenna mast with FM-broadcasting antennas. The pinnacle above 146.5 metres carries a glass fibre cylinder with the UHF-TV-broadcasting antennas.

Radiated TV programmes (before digital switch-over) 

Communication towers in Germany
Towers completed in 1972
Restaurant towers
1972 establishments in West Germany